Oscar Magnus Fredrik Björnstjerna (6 March 1819, in Stockholm – 2 September 1905, in Stockholm) was a Swedish officer, diplomat and politician. He served as Minister for Foreign Affairs from 1872 to 1880.

References

19th-century Swedish politicians
19th-century Swedish military personnel
1819 births
1905 deaths
Ambassadors of Sweden to the Russian Empire
Military personnel from Stockholm
Swedish Army major generals
Swedish Ministers for Foreign Affairs
19th-century Swedish diplomats